is a Japanese professional shogi player ranked 6-dan.

Early life
Kanai was born on May 25, 1986, in Ageo, Saitama. He learned how to play shogi from his grandfather when he was about six years old. In August 1999, he was accepted into the Japan Shogi Association's apprentice school at the rank of 6-kyū under the guidance of shogi professional . He was promoted to the rank of 3-dan in 2003, and obtained full professional status and the rank of 4-dan in April 2007 after the tying for first place with Masayuki Toyoshima in the 40th 3-dan League (October 2006March 2007) with a record of 14 wins and 4 losses. Kanai had a record of three wins and four losses after seven games in the 40th 3-dan League before winning his next eleven games to gain professional status.

Promotion history
Kanai's promotion history is as follows:
 6-kyū: 1999
 4-dan: April 1, 2007
 5-dan: March 9, 2010
 6-dan: March 9, 2016

Titles and other championships
Kanai's only appearance to date in a major title match came in 2018 when he was defeated 4 games to none by Taichi Takami in the 3rd Eiō title match.

Awards and honors
Kanai received the Japan Shogi Association's Annual Shogi Awards "Most Consecutive Games Won" for 2008 and "Special Game of the Year" for 2009.

References

External links
ShogiHub: Professional Player Info · Kanai, Kota

Japanese shogi players
Living people
Professional shogi players
Professional shogi players from Saitama Prefecture
People from Ageo, Saitama
1986 births